Kuivastu is a village on the eastern coast of the Estonian island Muhu. Kuivastu Harbour is the primary gateway to the biggest Estonian island Saaremaa (Muhu and Saaremaa are distinct islands, but are connected by a causeway Väinatamm). The corresponding harbour on the continental side is situated in Virtsu. Kuivastu administratively belongs to Muhu Parish of Saare County. In 2000, the village had a population of 73.

Kuivastu was the location of Kuivastu Manor (Kuiwast).

Poet, translator, linguist and folklorist Villem Grünthal-Ridala (1885–1942) was born at Kuivastu tavern.

Gallery

In popular culture
Kuivastu, referred to as Kuivast, is described by English adventurer-writer Arthur Ransome in his nautical yarn Racundra's First Cruise

References

External links
Kuivastu Harbour

Villages in Saare County
Populated coastal places in Estonia